

The Latécoère 21 was a French flying boat built in 1925 for use by Lignes Aériennes Latécoère as an airliner on routes between France and North Africa. It was the first of the Latécoère flying boats, and the first aircraft to deliver mail between Marseilles and Algiers. It was a conventional design for the era, with a monoplane wing mounted parasol-fashion. Warren truss-style struts braced the wing to stub wings that acted as sponsons for stability while on the water. The twin engines were placed in tandem push-pull configuration on the wing. Up to seven passengers could be seated in an enclosed cabin, and two pilots sat side by side in separate open cockpits.

Variants
 Latécoère 21 - initial version with Gnome et Rhône 9A Jupiter engines (1 built)
 Latécoère 21bis - main production version with revised hull and empennage (5 built)
 Latécoère 21ter - version with Farman 12We engines (1 built)

Specifications (21 bis)

References

 
 aviafrance.com
 Уголок неба

1920s French airliners
Flying boats
2
Twin-engined push-pull aircraft
Parasol-wing aircraft
Aircraft first flown in 1926